Legends is the eleventh album from jazz vocalist Gary Williams. Recorded at Kenilworth Studios in 2019, it is a tribute to the stars of Las Vegas including Tom Jones, Elvis Presley and The Rat Pack. It was recorded with big band and a jazz combo.

Writing about the album, the Grimsby Telegraph said that Leslie Bricusse "has become a great fan of Gary’s voice" and quoted him saying: "Songs like these make you want the ghosts of Mel Tormé and Matt Monro to come back and sing them. Until they do, Gary Williams is their worthy guardian. Michael Buble please note!"

Nick Wakeman reviewing for Musical Theatre Review gave the album 5 stars and said: "Williams is a consummate cabaret artist whose delivery is immaculate. These aren’t carbon copies of the original, he doesn’t try to be Sinatra or Martin but gives his own interpretation. Sometimes that could go too far but he always manages to reign it in and keep the essence of the original – which is very clever."

Track listing

Personnel 
Performers
 Gary Williams – vocals
 Piano/keys – Clive Dunstall, Matt Regan
 Bass – Joe Pettitt 
 Drums – Elliott Henshaw
 Guitar – Tommy Emmerton, Tim Rose, Justin Quinn
 Trombone and Percussion – Chris Traves
 Reeds – Adrian Revell
 Trumpet – Malcolm Melling
 Arrangers – Phil Steel, David Carter, Paul Campbell, Mike Brown
 Recorded at Kenilworth Studios
 Producer and Studio Engineer: Chris Traves
 Executive Producer: Gary Williams

References

External links 
 Official Gary Williams web site: Legends

2019 albums
Gary Williams (singer) albums